Mattie Donnelly may refer to:

 Mattie Donnelly (hurler), Irish hurler
 Mattie Donnelly (Gaelic footballer), Irish Gaelic footballer